Hibbertia quadricolor is a species of flowering plant in the family Dilleniaceae and is endemic to the south-west of Western Australia.

This species was first formally described in 1923 by Karel Domin in the journal Vestnik Kralovske Ceske Spolecnosti Nauk, Trida Matematiko-Prirodevedecke from specimens collected by Arthur Dorrien-Smith. The specific epithet (quadricolor) means "four-coloured", and refers to each of the leaves, bracts, sepals and young leaves being a different colour. 

Hibbertia quadricolor grows on ridges, hills and flats in the Jarrah Forest biogeographic region of south-western Western Australia.

See also
List of Hibbertia species

References

quadricolor
Eudicots of Western Australia
Plants described in 1923
Taxa named by Karel Domin